Uokiri Dam  is a gravity dam located in Hiroshima Prefecture in Japan. The dam is used for flood control, water supply and power production. The catchment area of the dam is 38.4 km2. The dam impounds about 40  ha of land when full and can store 8460 thousand cubic meters of water. The construction of the dam was started on 1971 and completed in 1981.

References

Dams in Hiroshima Prefecture